The typical warblers are small birds belonging to the genus Sylvia in the  "Old World warbler" (or sylviid warbler) family Sylviidae.

There are 7 species in the genus. Typical warblers occur in the temperate to tropical regions of Europe, western and central Asia, and Africa, with the highest species diversity centred on the Mediterranean.

They are strongly built, with stouter legs and a slightly thicker bill than many other warblers. The plumage is in varying shades of grey and brown, usually darker above and paler below, with bluish or pinkish tones in several species; several also have orange-brown or rufous fringed wing feathers. The tail is square-ended in most, slightly rounded in a few, and in several species has white sides. Many of the species show some sexual dimorphism, with distinctive male and female plumages, with the males in many having black or bright grey on the heads, replaced by brown, brownish-grey or similar dusky colours in females; about a third of the species also have a conspicuous red eye ring in males. Species breeding in cool temperate regions are strongly migratory, while most of those in warmer regions are partially migratory or resident. They are active warblers usually associated with open woodland, scrub, hedges or shrubs. Their diet is largely insectivorous, though several species also eat fruit extensively, mainly small berries such as elder and ivy, particularly from late summer to late winter; one species (blackcap) also frequently takes a wide variety of human-provided foods on birdtables in winter.

Taxonomy and systematics
The genus Sylvia was introduced in 1769 by the Italian naturalist Giovanni Antonio Scopoli. Scopoli did not specify a type species but this was designated as the Eurasian blackcap (Sylvia atricapilla) by Charles Lucien Bonaparte in 1828. The genus name is from Modern Latin silvia, a woodland sprite, related to silva meaning "a wood".

The typical warblers are now known to form a major lineage in a clade containing also the parrotbills and some taxa formerly considered to be Old World babblers. The other "Old World warblers" have been moved to their own families, entirely redelimiting the Sylviidae.

A molecular phylogenetic study using mitochondrial DNA sequence data published in 2011 found that the species in the genus Sylvia formed two distinct clades. Based on these results, the ornithologists Edward Dickinson and Leslie Christidis in the fourth edition of Howard and Moore Complete Checklist of the Birds of the World, chose to split the genus and moved most of the species into a resurrected genus Curruca retaining only the Eurasian blackcap and the garden warbler in Sylvia. In an additional change they moved the African hill babbler and Dohrn's thrush-babbler into Sylvia. The split was not made by the British Ornithologists' Union on the grounds that "a split into two genera would unnecessarily destabilize nomenclature and results in only a minor increase in phylogenetic information content."

Extant species
The genus as currently circumscribed includes the following species:
 Eurasian blackcap Sylvia atricapilla
 Garden warbler Sylvia borin
 Dohrn's warbler Sylvia dohrni
 Abyssinian catbird Sylvia galinieri
 Bush blackcap Sylvia nigricapillus
 African hill babbler Sylvia abyssinica
 Rwenzori hill babbler Sylvia atriceps

References

Further reading

External links
Typical warbler videos on the Internet Bird Collection

 
Taxa named by Giovanni Antonio Scopoli